Chiyou (蚩尤) is a mythological being that appears in East Asian mythology.

Individual 
According to the Song dynasty history book Lushi, Chiyou's surname was Jiang, and he was a descendant of flame.

According to legend, Chiyou had a bronze head with a distinct metal forehead. He had 4 eyes and 6 arms, wielding terrible sharp weapons in every hand, similar to a description of fangxiangshi. In some sources, Chiyou had certain features associated with various mythological bovines: his head was that of a bull with two horns, although the body was human, and his hindquarters were those of a bear. He is said to have been unbelievably fierce, and to have had 81 brothers and many followers. Historical sources often described him as 'bold leader', as well as 'brave'. Some sources have asserted that the figure 81 should rather be associated with 81 clans in his kingdom. Chiyou knows the constellations and the ancients spells for calling upon the weather. For example, he called upon a fog to surround Huangdi and his soldiers during the Battle of Zhuolu.

Tribe 
Chiyou is regarded as a leader of the Nine Li tribe (RPA ) by nearly all sources. However, his exact ethnic affiliations are quite complex, with multiple sources reporting him as belonging to various tribes, in addition to a number of diverse peoples supposed to have directly descended from him.

Some sources from later dynasties, such as the Guoyu book, considered Chiyou's Li tribe to be related to the ancient San miao tribe. In the ancient Zhuolu Town is a statue of Chiyou commemorating him as the original ancestor of the Miao people. The place is regarded as the birthplace of the San miao / Miao people, the Hmong being a subgroup of the Miao. In various sources, the "nine Li" tribe is called the "Jiuli" kingdom, Jiuli meaning "nine Li". Modern Han Chinese scholar Weng Dujian considers Jiuli and San Miao to be Man southerners. Chiyou has also been counted as part of the Dongyi.

Epic battles

Chiyou (Old Chinese (ZS): *tʰjɯ-ɢʷɯ) was a tribal leader of the Nine Li tribe in ancient China. He is best known as a king who lost against the future Yellow Emperor during the Three Sovereigns and Five Emperors era in Chinese mythology. For some Hmong people, Chiyou or Txiv Yawg was a sagacious mythical king. He has a particularly complex and controversial ancestry, as he may fall under Dongyi Miao or even Man, depending on the source and view. Today, Chiyou is honored and worshipped as the God of War and one of the three legendary founding fathers of China.

Description
When the Yan emperor was leading his tribe and conflicts with Nine Li tribes led by Chiyou, the Yan emperor stood no chance and lost the fight. He escaped, and later ended up in Zhuolu begging for help from the Yellow Emperor. At this point the epic battle between Chiyou and the Yellow Emperor's forces began. The battle last for 10 years with Chiyou having the upper hand. 
During the Battle of Zhuolu, Chiyou breathed out a thick fog and obscured the sunlight. The battle dragged on for days while the emperor's side was in danger. Only after the Yellow Emperor invented the south-pointing chariot, did he find his way out of the battlefield. Chiyou then conjured up a heavy storm. The Yellow Emperor then called upon the drought demon Nüba, who blew away the storm clouds and cleared the battlefield. Chiyou and his army could not hold up, and were later killed by the Yellow Emperor. After this defeat, the Yellow Emperor is said to become the ancestor of all Huaxia. His followers were forced to live in the mountains and leave their Li kingdom. After Chiyou's death, it is said that it rained blood for some time.

Societal influence
According to the Records of the Grand Historian, Qin Shi Huang worshiped Chiyou as the God of War, and Liu Bang worshiped at Chiyou's shrine before his decisive battle against Xiang Yu. The mythical title God of War was given to Chiyou because the Yellow Emperor and Yan Emperor could not defeat Chiyou alone.  Altogether, Chiyou won 9 major battles including 80 minor confrontations.  On the 10th and final war, both emperors combined their forces and conquered Chiyou.

Chiyou remains as a figure of worship today.

In one mythical episode, after Chiyou had claimed he could not be conquered, the goddess Nuwa dropped a stone tablet on him from Mount Tai. The stone failed to crush Chiyou, who managed to escape. From then on, the 5-finger-shaped stone tablet, inscribed "Mount Tai shigandang" became a spiritual weapon to ward off evil and disasters.

According to notes by the Qing dynasty painter Luo Ping: "Yellow Emperor ordered his men to have Chiyou beheaded... seeing that Chiyou's head was separated from his body, later sages had his image engraved on sacrificial vessels as a warning to those that would covet power and wealth."

The Tale of Heike mentions a comet "of the type called Chiyou's Banner or Red Breath."

In popular culture
 Ch'ih-yu (conceptualized as a dragon) is one of the characters in the background story in The Settlers III.
 Chi You is a name for an Aragami creature in the PlayStation Portable game, God Eater.
 The comic book Heavenly Executioner Chiwoo is partly based on the legends about Chiyou.
 The main antagonist of the Shenmue saga, Lan Di, is one of the leaders of a group called the Chi You Men, who seek to awake the power of the God Chi You.
 A series of South Korean bullion coins minted by KOMSCO feature Chiyou, referred to as the Chiwoo Cheonwang series.
 Chi You appears as an antagonist in the TMNT/Ghostbusters miniseries of the Teenage Mutant Ninja Turtles IDW comics continuity. Herein he is a godling or immortal creature who is engaged with others of his kind—including the Rat King and Kitsune—in a "game" for dominion over mankind.
 There is a Mechanical Mod used in the vaping community known as the Chi You.
 He is also a reoccurring demon in the Megami Tensei video game series.
 Chi You appears as sub-boss enemy in the video game La-Mulana.
 Chi You's clan became a group of priestess/assassin combo in Kingdom, where Qiang Lei was once part of.
 In the 1997 South Korean cartoon  Mythology of Heaven by Lee Hyun-se, chiyou appears as the protagonist in book 2.
 The descendants of Chi You formed a warrior order named Saulabi in the novel of The God of High School
 He is one of the kings represented by the members of the K-pop boy group Kingdom, as one of them is named "Chiwoo". His story is told in the album "History of Kingdom: Part II. Chiwoo".
 He appears as a man-eating evil deity in the manga Record of ragnarok
 Chiyou appears as Shuuu Yasogami, the final stage boss of the Touhou fangame Infinite Blade Pavilion. In this iteration, Shuuu is able to produce weapons. However, in her character profile, she's said not to have a savage personality - only that of a gentle craftsman.
 Chiyou appears in Marvel Comics as the archenemy of the Chinese superhero Sword Master.  In the comics, Chiyou is depicted as an evil monstrous god who was defeated and sealed away along with his demonic army by the Yellow Emperor and the descendants of the Three Sovereigns.  In the present day, Chiyou's seals have weakened, allowing his demonic minions to escape and to find a way revive their master, prompting Fu Xi's descendant Sword Master (Lin Lie) to take of the fabled Sword of Fu Xi to stop Chiyou's release.
 In the mobile game Arknights, published by Yostar, Superintendent Ch’en of the Lungmen Guard Department wields a “dragon-slaying” sword named Chi You.

See also
 Zhuolu County
 Mogwai
 Ox-Head and Horse-Face
 Ox in Chinese mythology

References

Bibliography
 Michael J. Puett, The Ambivalence of Creation: Debates Concerning Innovation and Artifice in Early China. 2001

Legendary Chinese people
Characters in Chinese mythology
Chinese gods
War gods
Hmong culture
Mythological kings